Aozora (Japanese for "blue sky") may refer to:

Aozora Bank, a Japanese bank
Aozora Bunko, a Japanese online literature library
Aozora Records, a Japanese record company

Songs
"Aozora no Namida", a song by Hitomi Takahashi
"Aozora", a song by Utaibito Hane
"Aozora", a song by Shiina Ringo
"Aozora" (song), a song by the band The Blue Hearts
"Aozora", a song from the Aya Ueto album Message
"Aozora", a song by Eikichi Yazawa
"Aozora", a song by Ken Hirai
"Aozora", a song by Miwa (singer)
"Aozora kataomoi", a song by SKE48
"Aozora no Soba ni Ite", a song by AKB48

Art
Aozora, a manga film by Naoki Yamamoto
Aozora Shōjotai, an anime series released as 801 T.T.S. Airbats outside Japan

See also
Ōzora (disambiguation), Japanese word for extensive sky